William Ntoso was a Ghanaian politician who served in the Parliament of Ghana from 1957 until 1966, representing the Atebubu constituency.

Biography 
William Ntoso was a teacher and member of the National Liberation Movement. In the 1956 Gold Coast general election, Ntoso was elected to the Gold Coast Legislative Assembly, representing the Atebubu constituency. Ntoso received 2,970 votes in the election, defeating J. E. Buanya of the Convention People's Party and independent candidate J. G. Assare, who received 2,565 and 503 votes, respectively.

Following Ghana's independence in 1957, Ntoso continued represent the Atebubu constituency in the Parliament of Ghana. That year, Ntoso was also appointed by the Ashanti Interim Regional Assembly to the Ashanti Police Relations Committee. Ntoso joined the United Party by 1959, and later that year served as one of Ghana's representatives to the Inter-Parliamentary Union. By 1962, he joined the Convention People's Party. In the 1965 Ghanaian parliamentary election, Ntoso was re-elected to parliament unopposed, as the CPP was the sole legal party and candidates were selected by its central committee.

During his tenure in parliament, Ntoso proposed the connection of direct telephone lines to Atebubu, and supported the Ghana Police Service in a crackdown on prostitution.

References 

Year of birth missing
Year of death missing
Ghanaian MPs 1956–1965
Ghanaian MPs 1965–1966
Convention People's Party (Ghana) politicians
National Liberation Movement (Ghana) politicians
United Party (Ghana) politicians
Delegates to the Inter-Parliamentary Union Assembly
People from Bono East Region
20th-century Ghanaian educators
Date of birth missing (living people)
Date of death missing
Place of birth missing
Place of death missing